SAM Basket Massagno, for sponsorship reasons Spinelli Massagno, is a professional basketball club based in Massagno, Switzerland. The team currently plays in the Swiss Basketball League, the highest professional division in Switzerland. The team plays its home games at the palestra di Nosedo (SEM Nosedo), which has a capacity of 1,000 people.

Honours
SBL Cup
Runners-up (2): 2019, 2021

Notable players

 Clint Chapman

References

Basketball teams in Switzerland